Pirmurod Burkhanov (born 30 October 1977) is a retired Tajikistani International footballer.

Career statistics

International

Statistics accurate as of 19 February 2016

International goals
Goals for Senior National team

Honours

Club
Regar-TadAZ
 Tajik League (5): 2001, 2002, 2003, 2004, 2006
 Tajik Cup (3): 2000, 2001, 2006
Khujand
 Tajik Cup (1): 2008

References

External links
 

1977 births
Living people
Tajikistani footballers
Tajikistani expatriate footballers
Tajikistan international footballers
Association football forwards